Robert Seale Calvert (April 27, 1892September 1, 1981) was the longest-serving Texas Comptroller of Public Accounts, serving for 26 years.

From 1909 to 1910, Calvert attended Baptist-affiliated Howard Payne Junior College in Brownwood, Texas.

On January 18, 1949, Calvert was appointed by Governor Beauford Jester to the position of Texas Comptroller of Public Accounts following the death of his predecessor, George H. Sheppard, who died in office. He was elected to a full term in 1950 and re-elected in 1952, 1954, 1956, 1958, 1960, 1962, 1964, 1966, 1968, 1970 and 1972, serving for twenty-six years.

When the African American then State Representative Eddie Bernice Johnson, later a member of the United States House of Representatives, filed a complaint with the Equal Employment Opportunity Commission (EEOC) in 1973, Calvert said in response, that Johnson was a "nigger woman who doesn't know what she is talking about." The EEOC ruled that racial discrimination could be inferred based on Calvert's response.

In 1972, Randy Pendleton, a former legislator from Andrews in West Texas, and Jim Wilson, a former employee, ran against Calvert.  There was a run-off between Calvert and Wilson, in which Calvert won.

In 1974, Bob Bullock announced that he would challenge the octogenarian comptroller and promised to reform operations of the office.  Bullock was so aggressive that Calvert withdrew from the race, and Bullock was elected to the first of four terms.
 
Calvert died in Austin in September 1981.

Sources

1892 births
1981 deaths
Howard Payne University alumni
Texas Democrats
People from Austin, Texas
American military personnel of World War I
Comptrollers of Texas